Koregaon taluka is a Taluka in Satara subdivision of Satara district of state of Maharashtra in India.

See also
Pimpode Budruk

References

Talukas in Maharashtra